Bagan Lalang is a coastal beach in Sepang District, Selangor, Malaysia. It is close to the border with Negeri Sembilan's Port Dickson District. A popular picnic and camping spot on weekends, housing and tourism developments around the area have been rapid in the past decade due to its proximity to the Kuala Lumpur International Airport and the Sepang International Circuit.

References

Sepang District
Beaches of Malaysia
Nature sites of Selangor
Populated coastal places in Malaysia